The boys’ high jump competition at the 2014 Summer Youth Olympics was held on 20–23 August 2014 in Nanjing Olympic Sports Center.

Schedule

Results

Qualification
The top 8 jumpers qualified to the Final A, while the other jumpers competed in the Final B.

Finals

Final A

Final B

External links
 iaaf.org - Men's high jump
 Nanjing 2014 - Athletics Official Results Book
 

Athletics at the 2014 Summer Youth Olympics